John XXIII College may refer to:

 John XXIII College, Cochabamba, Bolivia
 John XXIII College, Perth, Australia
 John XXIII College, Australian National University, Canberra, Australia

See also 
 Pope John XXIII High School (disambiguation)